The Dark Half is the title of a 1989 horror novel by Stephen King. 

The Dark Half may also refer to:

 The Dark Half (film), a 1993 film based on the Stephen King novel
 Dark Half (video game), a Super Nintendo Entertainment System game

See also
 In the Dark Half, a 2011 British drama film